Jarrad Butler (born 20 July 1991) is an Australian professional rugby union player. He primarily plays as a flanker but also plays at number 8. Butler currently plays for and captains Irish provincial side Connacht in the Pro14. While playing for the Brumbies, Butler also played for National Rugby Championship the Canberra Vikings, where he served as captain.

Born in Wellington, New Zealand Butler moved to Australia at 13, and has represented the country at under-age level. He played for the Australia schoolboys team in 2008 and the under-20 side in 2010. Butler has also played for international invitational side, the Barbarians.

Early life
Butler was born in Wellington, New Zealand and moved with his family to the Gold Coast in Australia as a 13-year-old. He attended The Southport School on a rugby scholarship. After finishing in school, Butler was part of the national academy of the Australian Rugby Union and also studied part time at Queensland University of Technology.

Club career

Reds
He played again in the last game of the regular season against . Butler's performances in 2012 prompted head coach Ewen McKenzie to name him in the franchise's Extended Playing Squad for 2013. Butler was capped a further 10 times throughout the 2013 Super Rugby season, with all but one of these appearances coming from the bench.

Brumbies
Butler joined Canberra-based side, the  ahead of the 2014 Super Rugby season. The move saw him earn far greater game time, starting in all 18 of the side's matches that season, including both knockout games as the Brumbies reached the semi-final stage. The following season again saw Butler feature in all games as the Brumbies reached the semi-final stage, although half of his appearances came as a replacement following the return from injury of the team's vice-captain David Pocock.

In the 2016 season, he featured in 13 of 16 games for the side, starting on all but two occasions. Butler had a slow start to the 2017 season, with a hamstring injury keeping him out of the opening rounds. He went on to play in a total of 11 games for the season, starting in just four of them. It was announced in July 2017 that Butler would leave Brumbies at the end of the 2017 season. During his time with the Brumbies, he made a total of 60 appearances, scoring five tries.

Canberra Vikings
During his time with the Brumbies, Butler also played for club side the Canberra Vikings. With the Vikings, he competed in the National Rugby Championship, a club competition established in 2014. Butler played in seven of the team's eight games in the inaugural season, and scored six tries. In the 2015 season he was named captain, and started all 10 of the side's games as they finished runners up to Brisbane City. Butler retained the captaincy for the 2016 season, where he featured in six games. His departure for Connacht at the end of the 2017 Super Rugby season meant he did not play for the Vikings in the 2017 NRC. He made a total of 23 appearances in his three seasons with the side.

Connacht
In July 2017, it was announced that Butler had signed a three-year contract with Irish Pro14 side Connacht. He joined the province ahead of the 2017–18 season. He was a regular fixture in the first team for the year, starting in 17 of the side's 26 games and featuring from the bench in a further two. At the end of his first season, Butler was named Connacht's Players' Player of the Year. Following the retirement of long-serving captain John Muldoon in 2018, Butler was named as the province's new captain for the 2018–19 season. He continued to be a regular fixture in the team, starting 19 of the team's 21 regular season games in the 2018–19 Pro14 as they finished third in their conference. He also started in the play-off quarter-final defeat to Ulster at the end of the season.

International career
Born in New Zealand, Butler has represented Australia at under-age level after moving there as a teenager. As a student in The Southport School, he made the Australian schoolboys team in 2008. In 2010, Butler played four games for the Australian under-20 side.

Butler has also played for international invitational side, the Barbarians. He was called up for the team's game against  on 21 November 2015. Butler featured as a replacement in a 49–31 defeat.

Playing statistics

Super Rugby statistics

Connacht statistics

References

External links
Jarrad Butler Connacht Profile
Jarrad Butler Player Profile
itsrugby.co.uk profile

Australian rugby union players
Queensland Reds players
ACT Brumbies players
Canberra Vikings players
Rugby union flankers
Rugby union number eights
Rugby union players from Wellington City
New Zealand emigrants to Australia
1991 births
Living people
People educated at the Southport School
Barbarian F.C. players
Connacht Rugby players
Australian expatriate rugby union players
Expatriate rugby union players in Ireland
Australian expatriate sportspeople in Ireland
Australian people of New Zealand descent